Chrétien-Louis-Joseph de Guignes (1759–1845) was a French merchant-trader, ambassador and scholar, born in Paris. He was the son of French academician and sinologue, Joseph de Guignes.  He learned Chinese from his father, and then traveled to China where he stayed for the next 17 years and returned to France in 1801.

At court of the Qianlong Emperor 
In 1794-95, de Guignes served as interpreter for Isaac Titsingh, the Dutch ambassador to the court of the Qianlong Emperor of China.
 

Titsingh travelled to Peking (Beijing) for celebrations of the sixtieth anniversary of the Emperor's reign. The Titsingh delegation also included the Dutch-American  Andreas Everardus van Braam Houckgeest, whose description of this embassy to the Chinese court were soon published in the U.S. and Europe. In the year following the emperor's rebuff to the 1793 mission headed by LordGeorge Macartney, Titsingh and his colleagues were much feted by the Chinese because of what was construed as seemly compliance with conventional court etiquette.

In 1808, de Guignes published his account of the Titsingh mission, which provided an  alternate perspective and a useful counterpoint to other reports which were then circulating.  Neither the Europeans nor the Chinese could have known that the Titsingh embassy  would turn out to have been the last occasion in which any European appeared before the Chinese Court within the context of traditional Chinese imperial foreign relations.

Sinologist 
In 1808, Napoleon ordered de Guignes to prepare a Chinese-French-Latin dictionary.  The work was completed five years later. Shortly after the publication, it was discovered that the dictionary was nothing more than a copy of an older work composed by the Franciscan friar, Basilio Brollo of Gemona (1648–1704).  While de Guignes had altered the original by arranging the characters according to the order of the 214 radicals (as contrasted with Basilio's tone-based order), the dictionary received strong criticism in 1814 from the first person to be appointed to be a professor of Chinese at a European institution of higher learning, Jean-Pierre Abel-Rémusat (1788–1832).  Despite the controversy, de Guignes was elected a member of the Institut de France in the Académie des Sciences (Géographie et Navigation) and of the Académie des Inscriptions et Belles-Lettres.

Guignes was also the author of a work of travels (Voyages a Pékin, Manille, et l'île de France, 1808).

Works
 de Guignes, C.-L.-J. (1813). Dictionnaire Chinois, Français et Latin, le Vocabulaire Chinois Latin. Paris: Imprimerie Impériale. 
 . v.1, v.2, v.3, v.4 (atlas)

Notes

References 
 van Braam Houckgeest, A.E. (1797). Voyage de l'ambassade de la Compagnie des Indes Orientales hollandaises vers l'empereur de la Chine, dans les années 1794 et 1795. Philadelphia: M.L.E. Moreau de Saint-Méry.
 ___.  (1798). An authentic account of the embassy of the Dutch East-India company, to the court of the emperor of China, in the years 1974 and 1795, Vol. I. London : R. Phillips. [digitized by University of Hong Kong Libraries, Digital Initiatives, "China Through Western Eyes." ]
 Duyvendak, J.J.L. (1937). "The Last Dutch Embassy to the Chinese Court (1794-1795)." T'oung Pao 33:1-137.
 O'Neil, Patricia O. (1995). Missed Opportunities: Late 18th Century Chinese Relations with England and the Netherlands. [Ph.D. dissertation, University of Washington]
 Rockhill, William Woodville.  "Diplomatic Missions to the Court of China: The Kotow Question I," The American Historical Review, Vol. 2, No. 3 (Apr., 1897), pp. 427–442.
 Rockhill, William Woodville.  "Diplomatic Missions to the Court of China: The Kotow Question II," The American Historical Review, Vol. 2, No. 4 (Jul., 1897), pp. 627–643.

1759 births
1845 deaths
18th-century French diplomats
French orientalists
French sinologists
French merchants
Members of the Académie des Inscriptions et Belles-Lettres
Members of the French Academy of Sciences
French expatriates in China
18th-century French businesspeople
19th-century French businesspeople